The 29th Vehbi Emre Tournament 2011, was a wrestling event held in Istanbul, Turkey between 29 and 30 January 2011.

This international tournament includes competition men's Greco-Roman wrestling. This ranking tournament was held in honor of Turkish Wrestler and manager Vehbi Emre.

Medal table

Greco-Roman

Participating nations

References 

Vehbi Emre
2011 in sport wrestling
Sports competitions in Istanbul
International wrestling competitions hosted by Turkey
Vehbi Emre & Hamit Kaplan Tournament